The Soko G-4 Super Galeb, also referred to as N-62, is a Yugoslav single-engine, advanced jet trainer and light ground-attack aircraft designed by the Aeronautical Technical Institute at Žarkovo and manufactured by the SOKO aircraft factory in Mostar.

The Super Galeb was developed during the 1970s as a successor to, and replacement of, the Soko G-2 Galeb then in service with the Yugoslav Air Force. On 17 July 1978, the maiden flight was performed by a development aircraft, designated G-4 PPP; during 1983, the first G-4 made its first flight. Quantity production of the type commenced in 1984; the assembly line operated up until the breakup of Yugoslavia in 1991. A total of 85 aircraft were built, most of which went into service with the Yugoslav Air Force, although six G-4s were exported to Myanmar.

During the Yugoslav Wars, RV i PVO G-4s carried out ground-attack sorties, a total of four were recorded as having been lost to enemy air defences. During 1992, the remaining aircraft were relocated to Serbia and Montenegro where they entered service with the Air Force of the newly-formed FR Yugoslavia. A single G-4 was left over for the Republika Srpska Air Force. The Serbian Air Force has become the largest operator of the type, having acquired further Super Galebs from other ex-Yugoslavian republics. It intends to upgrade and operate its G-4s through to the 2030s.

Development 
The G-4 Super Galeb was developed during the 1970s as a replacement for Yugoslav Air Force's existing fleet of the G-2 Galeb, a straight-winged jet trainer aircraft that had been developed during the late 1950s. Prior to 1999, the Galeb was the most commonly used trainer operated by the Yugoslav Air Force. According to aviation periodical Flight International, the Super Galeb showed unmistakable lineage from the earlier G-2, sharing the same British-sourced Rolls-Royce Viper turbojet engine, albeit uprated for greater performance. However, aviation historian Christopher Chant notes that: "the Super Galeb bears no more relation to the G-2 Galeb than an identity of role, being an altogether more advanced aircraft.

The first of two prototypes had been reportedly completed by early 1978. Following completion of the initial ground testing phase, the Super Galeb's maiden flight was conducted on 17 July 1978. It was followed by the first flight of one of the six pre-production aircraft on 17 December 1980. These pre-production aircraft, along with the first prototype, were designated G-4 PPP; they possessed fixed tailplanes with inset elevators and no anhedral. Unlike the G-2 Galeb, both the wing and tail surfaces are swept on the Super Galeb, while avionics to enable flight even under adverse weather conditions and at night have been integrated.

In contrast to the development aircraft, production Super Galebs, along with the second prototype, were designated G-4; in terms of design, they differed by featured an all-moving anhedral tailplane as well as being equipped with comprehensive avionics improvements. Production aircraft use a gravity-based refuelling system, while the earlier development aircraft had been furnished with a pressurised refuelling system; this was slightly slower to refuel but was both simpler and cheaper. In addition to its training mission, the G-4 was also suited for light attack operations.

During 1983, the G-4 made its first flight, by which point it had been ordered in large numbers for the Yugoslav Air Force. Beyond the domestic market, it also competed internationally against jet trainers such as the Italian Aermacchi MB-339, the Czechoslovakian Aero L-39 Albatros, and the Spanish CASA C-101; Flight International observes that, while the G-4 offered less performance than the Franco-German Dassault/Dornier Alpha Jet, it was substantially cheaper to procure.

Design

The SOKO G-4 Super Galeb is a jet trainer and light attack aircraft. Its size allows the type to be applied to both basic and advanced flight syllabuses. Aesthetically, the Super Galeb resembles the Hawker Siddeley Hawk, a contemporary British jet trainer. In terms of the G-4's basic configuration, it is a low wing monoplane design with slightly tapered wings. It weighs  when empty and can carry  of fuel. The aircraft is fitted with a short nose cone, rounded fuselage, conventional empennage, semi-circular air intakes, vertical tailfin, rudder, ailerons, horizontal stabilisers and fuel tanks at the square tips.

The two crew, typically student and instructor, are seated in a tandem configuration under individual side-opening canopies. Both positions are provided with Martin-Baker-sourced ejection seats; the rear seat is slightly elevated to render better all-round visibility and aid in the supervision of a student pilot sitting in the front. The crew are provided with avionics that enable poor-weather flying; the forward position is provided with a radio altimeter and gyro-gunsight. For combat missions, the Super Galeb can be outfitted with a centreline-mounted gun pod containing a twin-barrel 23mm Gryazev-Shipunov GSh-23L cannon with up to 200 rounds. In addition, four hard points are installed beneath the wings, the inboard pair having a  capacity while the outboard have a  capacity; these can carry a variety of Western and Eastern European armaments and equipment; the inboard pylons are plumbed for 70 gallon external fuel tanks, a locally developed reconnaissance pod was also under development at one stage.

The G-4 is powered by a single British-sources Rolls-Royce Viper turbojet engine. Since its introduction, the aircraft's performance has been considerably improved by the adoption of the more powerful Rolls-Royce Viper 632-46 engine. For further performance, attachment points for jet-assisted take-off (JATO) rockets are present underneath the fuselage. To shorten landing distances, a drogue parachute can be deployed. Direct access to the engine is achieved via the removal of the rear fuselage forward of the fin.

Operational history

During the early 1990s, Yugoslavia embarked upon an upgrade programme for its G-4 fleet. Reportedly, this programme primarily revolved around the integration of new air-to-air and air-to-ground missiles, as well as an improved aiming capability, adjustments to raise engine reliability, and enhanced electronics.

The G-4 Super Galeb performed numerous combat missions during the Yugoslav Wars. In total, three G-4s were reportedly shot down, all pilots of which ejecting safely. As a result of the Yugoslav Wars, the nation of Yugoslavia broke up into multiple smaller nations; several of which possessed aircraft from the former republic's inventory.

During the NATO bombing of Yugoslavia, seven G-4s of the Leteće zvezde aerobatics team were destroyed at Golubovci Air Base, heavily contributing to the team disbanding during 1999. Since then, a group of Serbian aviation enthusiasts have assembled a new display team, but have equipped it with older Soko G-2 Galebs that had been previously withdrawn during the 1980s.

Since 2008, the Serbian Air Force, the largest operator of the type, has proposed a comprehensive upgrade of their remaining G-4Ms. Intended to be re-designated G4-MD, the envisioned upgrade programme, which largely revolves around new avionics for improved navigation, greater ease of control, and integrate new combat systems, is reportedly set to extend the type's service life through to the 2030s. Serbia has been able to acquire additional G-4s from other former Yugoslavian republics, often by bartering, to expand its operational fleet.

Variants

G-4: Advanced jet trainer and light ground-attack aircraft.
G-4Š: Unarmed jet trainer.
G-4T: Dedicated target tug model.
G-4M: Upgraded avionics and hardpoints, missile rail added to wingtips. Avionics include a Zrak ENP-MG4 HUD incorporating a Rudi Cajavec ENS-MG4 electronic sight, a gyro platform, multi function displays, and an optional chaff/flare dispensers. The inner hardpoints are rated at 500 kg, while the outer ones are rated at 350 kg, giving a maximum disposable load of 1,800 kg. Normal takeoff weight is 4,971 kg as a trainer, with a maximum takeoff weight of 6,400 kg in the attacker configuration, the maximum speed in "clean" configuration is 865 km/h at 10,000 m and 900 km/h at 4,000 m, with a ferry range of 2,900 km with drop tanks; range of 1,800 km with standard fuel, reduced to 1,200 km with cannon pack, four BL755 cluster bombs and two AAMs, maximum rate of climb at sea level of 1,800 m per minute, and a service ceiling of 12,500 m.
G-4MD: Further development of G-4M upgrade including: LCD flight screens, HOTAS, HUD, integrated mission computers, distance measuring equipment, GPS-based navigation systems, identification friend or foe, navcomm units, mission records, and VHF omni-range and instrument landing systems. Integration of guided weapons, countermeasures and targeting systems is also scheduled as part of the upgrade.

Operators
 : Serbian Air Force operates 20 G-4 aircraft as of 2022
 : Air Force operates three G-4 aircraft as of 2022

Former operators
 : Air Force inherited 1 G-4 aircraft from Republika Srpska. At one point, Bosnia was considering its sale to neighbouring Serbia.
 : Air Force Inherited 17 aircraft. Four of these were used, but have subsequently been put up for sale. By 2012, six aircraft were transferred to Serbia whilst seven were reportedly sold to a private operator.
 : Air Force operated 77 G-4 aircraft.

Aircraft on display
Serbia
 Museum of Aviation (Belgrade) in Belgrade – four Soko G-4 Super Galeb on display

Specifications (G-4M)

See also

References

Citations

Bibliography

 Chant, Christopher. A Compendium of Armaments and Military Hardware. Routledge, 2014. .

External links

 Aerosvet Magazine; (Entry from the International Directory of Design)
 G-4 Super Galeb No.23405

G-004 Super Galeb
1970s Yugoslav attack aircraft
1970s Yugoslav military trainer aircraft
Military Technical Institute Belgrade
Single-engined jet aircraft
Low-wing aircraft
Aircraft first flown in 1978